The 13th Air Force Corps of the People's Liberation Army Air Force was a military formation. It was activated in January 1971 in Shijiazhuang, Hebei province. The corps commander was Zhu Futian, and its commissar was Fang Zhongying. It was located within the Beijing Military Region for its entire period of service.

From August 1, 1975, the Corps' code-number was 39133. The exact composition of the corps remains unknown.

Known units:
17th Aviation Division;
3rd Radar Regiment.

The Corps was disbanded in January 1976 (163.com) or March 1976.

Reference 

Air force units and formations of the Chinese People's Liberation Army
Corps of the People's Liberation Army
Military units and formations established in 1971
Military units and formations disestablished in 1976